Diaphantania is a genus of moths of the family Crambidae.

Species
Diaphantania candacalis (C. Felder, R. Felder & Rogenhofer, 1875)
Diaphantania ceresalis (Walker, 1859)
Diaphantania impulsalis (Herrich-Schäffer, 1871)

References

Spilomelinae
Crambidae genera
Taxa named by Heinrich Benno Möschler